George Cassell Sr. (born May 25, 1935) is an American politician in the state of Minnesota. He served in the Minnesota House of Representatives.

References

Republican Party members of the Minnesota House of Representatives
1935 births
Living people